Erla is a municipality located in the province of Zaragoza, Aragon, Spain. According to the 2004 census (INE), the municipality has a population of 438 inhabitants.

See also
Castejón Mountains

References

External links
Sierra de Erla y castillo de Sora

Municipalities in the Province of Zaragoza